Hypsosinga pygmaea is a species of orb weaver in the spider family Araneidae. It is found in North America, Europe, Turkey, Israel, Caucasus, a range from Russia to Central Asia, China, Korea, and Japan.

Subspecies
These three subspecies belong to the species Hypsosinga pygmaea:
 (Hypsosinga pygmaea pygmaea) (Sundevall, 1831)
 Hypsosinga pygmaea nigra (Simon, 1909)
 Hypsosinga pygmaea nigriceps (Kulczynski, 1903)

References

External links

 

Araneidae
Articles created by Qbugbot
Spiders described in 1831